Marijn Anne Elise Veen (born 18 November 1996) is a field hockey player from the Netherlands who plays as a forward.

Personal life
Marijn Veen was born and raised in Utrecht, Netherlands.

She is the daughter of former Dutch international player Stephan Veen. and former Dutch international player Susan van der Wielen

Career

Club hockey
Veen played for Kampong until 2017 when she transferred to Amsterdam.

National teams

Indoor
In 2016 and 2018, Veen was a member of the Netherlands Indoor team at the EuroHockey Indoor Nations Championship in Minsk and Prague, winning gold and silver medals respectively.

She followed this up with a silver medal at the 2018 Indoor World Cup in Berlin.

Under–18 and Under–21
Veen was part of the Netherlands U–18 Team at the 2014 Summer Youth Olympics where the team finished second, losing to China in the final.

From 2015 to 2017, Veen was a member of the Netherlands U–21 team. She captained the team to a gold medal at the 2017 EuroHockey Junior Championship in Valencia.

Oranje Dames
Veen made her senior international debut in November 2018 at the Champions Trophy. She scored two goals in her debut, in a 3–1 win against Japan.

In 2019, Veen won two gold medals with the national team; at the Grand Final of the FIH Pro League in Amstelveen and at the EuroHockey Nations Championship in Antwerp.

International goals

References

External links
 

1996 births
living people
Dutch female field hockey players
Female field hockey forwards
Sportspeople from Utrecht (city)
Field hockey players at the 2014 Summer Youth Olympics
SV Kampong players
Amsterdamsche Hockey & Bandy Club players

2018 FIH Indoor Hockey World Cup players